The MEarth Project is a United States NSF-funded, robotic observatory that is part of Fred Lawrence Whipple Observatory on Mt. Hopkins, Arizona, US.  The project monitors the brightness of thousands of red dwarf stars with the goal of finding transiting planets. As red dwarf stars are small, any transiting planet blocks a larger proportion of starlight than transits around a Sun-like star would. This allows smaller planets to be detected through ground-based observations.

 MEarth-North
Consists of eight RC Optical Systems  f/9 Ritchey-Chrétien telescopes consists of eight (on Paramount ME robotic mounts) paired with commercially available cameras with 2048 × 2048 Apogee U42 CCDs.

 MEarth-South
Consists of eight additional 40cm telescopes, each equipped with a CCD camera sensitive to red optical and near-infrared light. It observes from Cerro Tololo Inter-American Observatory, east of La Serena, Chile.

Planets discovered
 GJ 1214 b
 GJ 1132b
 LHS 1140b

References

External links
 MEarth Project Page

Fred Lawrence Whipple Observatory
Exoplanet search projects